Phonetic matching may refer to:
 Phono-semantic matching
 Phonetic algorithm, an algorithms for phonetic string matching.